The 1965 Coupe de France Final was a football match held at Parc des Princes, Paris on 23 and 26 May 1965, that saw Stade Rennais UC defeat UA Sedan-Torcy.

Match details

First match

Replay

See also
Coupe de France 1964-65

External links
Coupe de France results at Rec.Sport.Soccer Statistics Foundation
Report on French federation site

Coupe De France Final
1965
Coupe De France Final 1965
Coupe De France Final 1965
May 1965 sports events in Europe
1965 in Paris